Harry Alfred Hanbury (January 1, 1863 – August 22, 1940) was a U.S. Representative from New York.

Hanbury was born in Bristol, England and immigrated to the United States with his parents at an early age.
He attended the public schools and was graduated from the Boys' High School in New York City.
He entered mercantile life and established ironworks.
He served as delegate to State conventions in 1896, 1898, 1900, 1902, 1906, and 1914.

Hanbury was elected as a Republican to the Fifty-seventh Congress (March 4, 1901 – March 3, 1903).
United States shipping commissioner, port of New York, from March 1903 to November 1909.
He established a foundry and machine works in Brooklyn, New York.
He engaged in mechanical engineering and ship reconstruction in Brooklyn, New York.
He died in Methuen, Massachusetts, August 22, 1940.
He was interred in Greenwood Cemetery, Brooklyn, New York.

References

1863 births
1940 deaths
Burials at Green-Wood Cemetery
Republican Party members of the United States House of Representatives from New York (state)